Coptosia antoniae is a species of beetle in the family Cerambycidae. It was described by Edmund Reitter in 1889, originally under the genus Phytoecia. It contains the varietas Coptosia antoniae var. uniformis.

References

Saperdini
Beetles described in 1889